Bill Kovach (born 1932) is an American journalist, former Washington bureau chief of The New York Times, former editor of the Atlanta Journal-Constitution, and co-author of the book The Elements of Journalism: What Newspeople Should Know and The Public Should Expect.

Biography 

Born in 1932 in East Tennessee to Albanian parents, Kovach planned, after attending college at East Tennessee State University, to go to graduate school in marine biology. After four years in the U.S. Navy, a summer job at the Johnson City Press Chronicle in Johnson City, Tennessee persuaded him to go into journalism.

Kovach covered the civil rights movement, politics and Appalachian poverty for the Nashville Tennessean from 1960 to 1967. In 1965, he was involved in a fight for public access to the legislature, when he refused to leave a committee hearing following a call for executive session. The state senate passed a resolution revoking his floor privileges. The Tennessean and editor John Seigenthaler, Sr. led a successful fight to open the legislative chambers.

After Kovach spent a year at Stanford University on a journalism fellowship, Scotty Reston of The New York Times Washington bureau hired him in 1968, and he spent 18 years there, including serving as its Washington bureau chief.

After a tempestuous two-year tenure as editor of the Atlanta Journal-Constitution, when his staff won two Pulitzer Prizes and were finalists for several others, Kovach moved on to Harvard University in 1989 as a fellow, then curator, of the Nieman Foundation for Journalism.

He retired from Harvard in 2001 and returned to Washington, where he is senior counselor to the Project for Excellence in Journalism.

Kovach is the North American representative and chair of the ICIJ (International Consortium of Investigative Journalists) Advisory Committee. He also serves on the faculty of the Missouri School of Journalism.

Awards 

In 2000, Kovach received the Elijah Parish Lovejoy Award as well as an honorary Doctor of Laws degree from Colby College. In 2007, he received an honorary doctorate from Boston University.

He founded the Committee of Concerned Journalists, which worked to increase the quality of journalism.

Besides The Elements of Journalism, Kovach is a co-author of Warp Speed: America in the Age of Mixed Media and Blur: How to Know What's True in the Age of Information Overload, all with Tom Rosenstiel.

In 2002, when it was discovered that USA Today reporter Jack Kelley had fabricated some of his stories, USA Today turned to Kovach, along with veteran editors Bill Hilliard and John Seigenthaler Sr., to monitor the investigation.

References

External links

Paula Devlin (2001). Profile of a Journalist
Tracy Thompson. A Newsroom Hero - journalist Bill Kovach. Washington Monthly, May 2000.
Biography from Boston University
Baccalaureate address by Bill Kovach at Boston University, 2007.
 
 

American people of Albanian descent
1932 births
Living people
Stanford University alumni
Nieman Fellows
20th-century American non-fiction writers
21st-century American non-fiction writers
American male journalists
Journalists from Tennessee
Elijah Parish Lovejoy Award recipients
The New York Times editors
The Atlanta Journal-Constitution people
20th-century American male writers
21st-century American male writers